Million Dollar Legs may refer to:

 Million Dollar Legs (1932 film), starring W. C. Fields
 Million Dollar Legs (1939 film), featuring Betty Grable
 Million Dollar Legs (album), the second album by The New Tony Williams Lifetime